Reisafjorden or Reisafjord may refer to the following places in Norway:

Reisafjorden (Nordreisa), a fjord in the municipality of Nordreisa in Troms county
Reisafjorden (Sørreisa), a fjord in the municipality of Sørreisa in Troms county